Doncaster Secondary College is a secondary school located in the Melbourne suburb of Doncaster.

Founded on 5 February 1969, the school adopts a non-selective enrolment policy and caters for over 1500 students from Year 7 to 12 - making it the largest high school in the city of Manningham. Senior students have access to a comprehensive Victorian Certificate of Education (VCE) curriculum in addition to Vocational Education and Training (VET) and the Victorian Certificate of Applied Learning (VCAL) units.

The College is characterised by its diverse student population with a representation of nearly fifty nationalities, incorporating the 70 full fee-paying international students enrolled in the International Student Program. The majority of international students are from China, Korea and South-east Asia. 33% of the student body speaks a language other than English at home. 

Doncaster Secondary College is affiliated with School Sports Victoria (SSV) and competes within the Eastern Zone at regional sporting events including athletics, soccer, basketball and swimming.

School structure

Year level structure 

Years 7 to 9 - middle school
Years 10 to 12 - senior school

School curriculum 
Doncaster Secondary uses the curriculum developed by the Victorian Curriculum and Assessment Authority to structure Key Learning Areas curriculum within the school.

External links
 Doncaster Secondary College website
 Doncaster Secondary College Careers website

Public high schools in Melbourne
Educational institutions established in 1969
1969 establishments in Australia
Buildings and structures in the City of Manningham